was a  after Ten'en and before Tengen. This period spanned the years from July 976 through November 978.

Change of era
 February 3, 976 : The new era name was created to mark an event or a number of events. The previous era ended and a new one commenced in Ten'en 4, on the 13th day of the 7th month of 976.

Events of the Jōgen era
 June 11, 976 (Jōgen 1, 11th day of the 5th month): The Imperial Palace was destroyed by a great fire.
 December 20, 977 ('Jōgen 2, 8th day of the 11th month): Fujiwara no Kanemichi dies at the age of 51.

Notes

References
 Brown, Delmer M. and Ichirō Ishida, eds. (1979).  Gukanshō: The Future and the Past. Berkeley: University of California Press. ;  OCLC 251325323
 Nussbaum, Louis-Frédéric and Käthe Roth. (2005).  Japan encyclopedia. Cambridge: Harvard University Press. ;  OCLC 58053128
 Titsingh, Isaac. (1834). Nihon Ōdai Ichiran; ou,  Annales des empereurs du Japon.  Paris: Royal Asiatic Society, Oriental Translation Fund of Great Britain and Ireland. OCLC 5850691
 Varley, H. Paul. (1980). A Chronicle of Gods and Sovereigns: Jinnō Shōtōki of Kitabatake Chikafusa''. New York: Columbia University Press. ;  OCLC 6042764

External links
 National Diet Library, "The Japanese Calendar" -- historical overview plus illustrative images from library's collection

Japanese eras